Global Emissions InitiAtive (GEIA) is a community effort dedicated to atmospheric emissions information exchange and competence building. GEIA was created in 1990 under the (IGBP) and is a joint IGAC / iLEAPS / AIMES activity.  GEIA is governed by an international steering committee  and hosts biennial conferences.

Goals 
 Access: Make emissions data and information about emissions more readily available
 Analysis: Improve the scientific basis for emissions information and policy making
 Community: Strengthen the science and policy relationships to enhance access to and analysis of emissions
information

Partnerships 
 Emissions of atmospheric Compounds & Compilation of Ancillary Data (ECCAD) provides data access to many emissions inventory datasets.

External links 
 GEIA website
 ECCAD website

References 

Air pollution
Climatological research organizations